Ulpahari is a tribal village in Birbhum district, West Bengal, India.

About
Santhals are living here for 200 years. There are approx 76 families living here. This village is located inside the forest, and Santhals have realised that they can make a living by selling plates (thalis/"tharis") made of sal leaves. There is a primary school named "Ulpahari primaryc school" at ulpahari. It is under "Birbhum District Primary school council".

Culture
Santhals are mainly an austric tribe.
They use santhali dialect in their village, but when they come to a "diku" (not santhal) village they use Bengali language.  They call themselves (i.e. santhal) -"Hor".
Ulpahari is a village poor inhabitants.  They have an ancient culture. They celebrate many festivals like Baha parab, Karam, Badna or Souharai etc.  Usually they drink homemade wine -Hariya, which made by mahuaflower/rice/yeast/gur etc. at their festivals or daily life.

Shivpahari
Shivpahari is a place of Ulpahari. Here an old shivlingam  of Jayadratha  is situated. The shivalinga is the contemporary of Mahabharata. Kalapahad  had cut the shivalinga into  pieces 
Here  Jayadratha had meditated for months in front of the four-foot shivlingam. His father had given him a boon wherein the one who 'dropped his head on the ground' would combust his head with hundreds pieces. In the Kurukshetra  battle,  Arjuna had cut  Jayadratha's head with half-moon shaped arrow. Jayadrath's head went flying and landed on the lap of his father Vridhakshatra, a rishi, who, shocked by the sight of his son's head, dropped it on the ground. He was immediately reduced to ashes.

Social and religious life
Residents of Ulpahari are all santhals. They have no temple but have an altar at the village.  They even worship saraswati, kali etc. Hindu gods.  They follow the
Sarna religion along with Hinduism. They believe at
Marangburu, Jaheraera, and
Manjhi. Santhals pay respect to
the ghosts and spirits like Kal
Sing, Lakchera, Beudarang etc. and have village priests known
as the naikey and shaman Ujha.
Animal sacrifices to the Gods is
the common practice common
practice among the Santhals to
appease the Gods and Goddess.

References

Villages in Birbhum district